Schinia septentrionalis, the northern flower moth, is a moth of the family Noctuidae. The species was first described by Francis Walker in 1858. It is found in North America from Missouri to Quebec to South Carolina and Louisiana. Records include Colorado, Oklahoma, South Dakota and Texas. It is listed as threatened in the US state of Connecticut.  

The wingspan is about 25 mm. There is one generation per year.

The larvae feed on various asters  including Symphyotrichum laeve, and Symphyotrichum oblongifolium.

References

Image

Schinia
Moths of North America
Moths described in 1858